Paril Saddle (Parilska Sedlovina \pa-'ril-ska se-dlo-vi-'na\) is a saddle of elevation 1398 m in Friesland Ridge in Tangra Mountains on Livingston Island, Antarctica.  Bounded by St. Boris Peak to the northeast, and Simeon Peak to the southwest.  Overlooking Macy Glacier to the east and southeast, and Huntress Glacier to the west and northwest. Bulgarian topographic survey in 1995/96 (estimated elevation 1390 m), and mapping in 2005 and 2009. It was first visited and GPS-surveyed by the Bulgarian climbers D. Boyanov, N. Petkov and N. Hazarbasanov on 15 January 2017.

The feature is named after the settlement of Paril and the adjacent homonymous saddle between Pirin Mountain and Slavyanka Mountain in southwestern Bulgaria.

Maps
 L.L. Ivanov et al. Antarctica: Livingston Island and Greenwich Island, South Shetland Islands. Scale 1:100000 topographic map. Sofia: Antarctic Place-names Commission of Bulgaria, 2005.
 L.L. Ivanov. Antarctica: Livingston Island and Greenwich, Robert, Snow and Smith Islands. Scale 1:120000 topographic map.  Troyan: Manfred Wörner Foundation, 2009.  
 Antarctic Digital Database (ADD). Scale 1:250000 topographic map of Antarctica. Scientific Committee on Antarctic Research (SCAR). Since 1993, regularly upgraded and updated.
 L.L. Ivanov. Antarctica: Livingston Island and Smith Island. Scale 1:100000 topographic map. Manfred Wörner Foundation, 2017.

Notes

References
 Paril Saddle. SCAR Composite Gazetteer of Antarctica.
 Bulgarian Antarctic Gazetteer. Antarctic Place-names Commission. (details in Bulgarian, basic data in English)

External links
 Paril Saddle. Copernix satellite image

Mountain passes of Livingston Island
Bulgaria and the Antarctic